Denis A. Hayes (1860 – January 2, 1917) was an American labor union leader.

Born in County Clare in Ireland, Hayes emigrated to the United States with his family, when he was seven years old.  The family settled in Zanesville, Ohio.  Hayes worked on a farm before finding work in a glass bottle factory.  He later moved to Newark, Ohio, where he joined the United Green Glass Workers' Association of the United States and Canada.  In 1894, he was elected as vice-president of the union, and in 1896 as president of what became the "Glass Bottle Blowers Association of the United States and Canada".

Hayes moved to Philadelphia to take up the presidency of the union.  In this role, he was prominent in the campaign against child labor.  From 1901, he also served as a vice-president of the American Federation of Labor, and on the executive of the National Civic Federation.  For the last 22 years of his life, he lived in the Hotel Windsor.  He died in 1917, and was buried in Zanesville.

References

1860 births
1917 deaths
American trade union leaders
Irish emigrants to the United States (before 1923)
People from County Clare